is a Japanese professor who used to write under the pen name . His primary area of writing is on Korean culture; he has also published instructional books for Korean learners of Japanese.

Early life and education
Mizuno was born 1968 in Muroran, Hokkaidō. By his own testimony, he became interested in Korea as a middle school student, after seeing hangul—the Korean writing system—for the first time. He attended Noboribetsu South High School and then Nara Prefecture's Tenri University, where he majored in Korean language; in 1990, he entered into a Ph.D. programme in Korean literature at Chonnam National University in Gwangju, South Korea. After completing his dissertation, he remained at the same university, where he took up a post as a lecturer in 1995. He later earned Ph.D. degree and became a professor in Chonnam National University where he had taught Japanese language to Korean students throughout the years.

Life in South Korea
Professor Mizuno became well known in South Korea for his command of Jeolla dialect and made frequent television and lecture appearances, often speaking about Japanese-Korean relations and the influence of Korea on ancient Japan; he was described as one of the best-known foreigners in South Korea. His pen name was known to the Korean media, and it had been reported as early as 2001 that he had published books critical of Korea, such as his 1996 How to write anti-Japanese novels in Korea or his 2001 Outbreak of a Korea-Japan War?, which he acknowledged took an aggressive approach to their subjects and could be offensive to Koreans; however, he retained popularity as a commentator. He stated that his goal in writing was to help both Japanese and Koreans overcome their historical conflict and develop closer relations. While living there, he married a Korean woman from Jeollabuk-do, with whom he had three sons. In total, he lived in South Korea for 15 years.

Return to Japan
In June 2005, South Korean newspaper Dong-A Ilbo reported more shockingly on the books and essays in which he had submitted under his pen name Nohira , including publications in rightist magazines; those of the works under his pen name were described as "degrading" to Korea, in contrast to those he wrote under his real name. One of the main targets of criticism was his 2002 book Koreans' false history of Japan. A few months later, he returned to Japan to take up a post as a lecturer in Korean language at the Hokkai School of Commerce in Sapporo.

Publications

General

Academic papers

Language instruction

References 

Japanese writers
Academic staff of Hokkai School of Commerce
Japanese expatriates in South Korea
People from Muroran, Hokkaido
1968 births
Living people
Academic staff of Chonnam National University